4 Plugs is the sixth album by The Mad Capsule Markets. The album has been known as a turning point in the band's career as it was a departure from the original melodic Japanese rock and punk sound to a more rap metal-based style. The melodious elements heard on Mix-ism and Park are largely gone, the sole exception being "Normal Life", replaced by aggressive and heavy beats. Most fans welcomed this newer sound and style, and the band attracted a new fanbase, but some fans of their earlier sound felt disappointed with their new direction.

This album also featured almost fully English songs such as "Walk!" and "Don't Suss Me Out".

Track listing

Charts

References

The Mad Capsule Markets albums
1996 albums